Sophia Elizabeth Reed (née Armstrong; May 16, 1842 – June 18, 1915) was an American oriental scholar and author whose books were widely used as college textbooks in various universities worldwide for Oriental studies. Hers were, at the time, the only works by a woman accepted by the Philosophical Society of Great Britain.

Biography
She was born in Winthrop, Maine.

She was married to Hiram Vaughn Reed, an Age to Come (One Faith) preacher and newspaper publisher, in 1860, meeting him at a religious debate in Buchanan, Michigan. She was the mother of author Myrtle Reed, and two sons, Earl Howell and Charles B. Reed.

In 1893, she was chairman of the Woman's Congress of Philology at Chicago and in 1896 became an editor of the Course of Universal Literature.  Reed served two terms as the president of the Illinois Woman's Press Association 1894 (January) until 1896 (June) and 1902 (June) until 1904 (June). She received honorary degrees from Northwestern and Illinois Wesleyan universities and Bethany College.

Elizabeth Armstrong Reed died in Chicago on June 18, 1915.

Selected works
 The Bible Triumphant (1866)
 Earnest Words for Honest Sceptics (1876)
 Hindu Literature; or the Ancient Books of India (1891)
 Persian Literature, Ancient and Modern (1893)
 Primitive Buddhism: Its Origins and Teachings (1896)
 Daniel Webster: A Character Sketch (1899)
 Hinduism in Europe and America (1914)

References

1842 births
1915 deaths
American editors
American non-fiction writers
American orientalists
People from Winthrop, Maine
Writers from Maine